The Timor-Leste national Under-16 football team is the national team of Timor-Leste and is controlled by the Federação de Futebol de Timor-Leste. East Timor has never had success on the international stage. They are currently one of the weakest teams in the world. East Timor joined FIFA on 12 September 2005.

Kits
Timor-Leste 's kit is a red jersey, red shorts and red socks. Their away kit is with a white jersey with black shorts and red or white socks. The kits are currently manufactured by Adidas and Nike. Timor-Leste first kit is under Tiger, when the team play for the 2004 Tiger Cup. The first kit is red jersey, black shorts and red sock and their away kit is white jersey with two black sleeves, black short and white socks.

Competitive record

FIFA U-17 World Cup

AFC U-16 Championship

AFF U-16 Youth Championship Record

Players

Current squad
The following 23 players were call-up for the 2019 AFF U-15 Youth Championship held in Thailand

Caps and goals updated as of, after the match against

Head Coach:  Agostinho Martins

Recent call-ups
The following players have also been called up to the Timor Leste squad within the last 18 months and are still available for selection.

Former player
 Nazario
 Akao
 Lomberto Gama
 Anggisu Barbosa
 Montenario Soares

List of Captains

List of Coaches

Fixtures and results

Recent results
2009 Result

2010 AFC U-16 Championship qualification

2010 Result

2010 AFF U-16 Youth Championship

2010 AFC U-16 Championship

2011 Result

2011 AFF U-16 Youth Championship

2012 AFC U-16 Championship qualification

2015 Result

2015 AFF U-16 Youth Championship

2016 AFC U-16 Championship qualification

2016 Result

2016 AFF U-16 Youth Championship

Stadium

 East Timor National Stadium    (2002-present)

References

External links
 Profile at FIFA.com
 Profile at the-AFC.com
 Profile at AFF Suzuki Cup Site
 Profile at AFF Site
 Profile at National-football-teams.com

u16
Asian national under-17 association football teams